Organizata Politike (OP), is a left-wing political organisation based in Albania. It was founded right after 4 protesters were shot dead during the 2011 Albanian opposition demonstrations.

History 

Organizata has been the initiator of the movement Universiteti në Rrezik (University in Danger), which aimed protecting public education and its emancipating values, when the ruling centre-right Democratic Party tried to pass a clientelist law of higher education and later Lëvizja Per Universitetin (The Movement for the university), when the new government of the centre-left Socialist Party tried the same only some months after winning the elections.

Name

The name Organizata Politike came as a way to express the absence of politics in other political subjects in Albania and the aim to make politics, considering that the political parties don't really make politics, just fight for power and wealth of a narrow group of people.

Ideology 
It unites bodies and minds aiming radical social transformation, based on equality, participation and freedom and it tries to reach its aims through politicising social matters and through organizing people, especially the most exploited classes, under emancipating forms of participation, militant-ism, action and discussion.

Organizata Politike's principles aspire a combination of engagement and awareness elements of direct democracy with coordinated action that stems from political delegation. 
During these years, Organizata has been engaged in different emancipating events, like manifestations on International Worker's Day, support and solidarity to the miners, textile industry workers, oilmen, Romani People and many others in need.

Symbols

In different cultures birds have symbolized freedom during history. You can find them on flags and in myths basing on which communities were built. Since early in history they've flied towards literature, music, visual arts, but also towards symbolism of new battles against political, economic and social injustice.

Thus, Organizata Politike thought of the Red Robin – Erithacus Rubecula – as a symbol of freedom and resistance in the wide horizon of ideas. Not as a powerful and aggressive bird of rough heights without oxygen, rather than a small, hard-working, nimble bird, tightly connected to its territory, that resists the winter singing while never leaving. 
The robin represents Organizata's organizational and political worldview best in a frosty Republic of Albania - which is quickly depopulating from emigration, especially the young: to be robins, to stay here(in Albania), to resist, to live vigorously and sing, by working day after day, every day for a fairer and democratic society.

Structure 

Organizata Politike is an organization consisting of activists and members, the only difference between the first and the latter being full active and partly active. Because the partly actives affect the day-to-day decision making, the activists take part in weekly assemblies while members in monthly assemblies.

The organizations highest decision-making body is the Assembly of the Activists. Other decision-making bodies are workgroups depending on the needs of the organization.

References

External links
Official website

2011 establishments in Albania
Democratic socialism in Europe
Organizations established in 2011
Political organizations based in Albania
Progressive International
Socialism in Albania
Socialist organizations in Europe